Mahmoud Saeed Ibrahim Almas (born 8 September 1983) is an Emirati footballer who plays as a goalkeeper.

References

External links
 

Emirati footballers
1983 births
Living people
Sharjah FC players
Al Ain FC players
Al Rams Club players
UAE First Division League players
UAE Pro League players
Association football goalkeepers